Fely Franquelli (November 11, 1916 – January 8, 2002) was a Filipino dancer, choreographer, and actress. Franquelli became known in the international dance scene in the 1930s.

Early life and career
Franquelli, who was of Filipino, Spanish and Italian descent, was born in Manila. She attended school in the Philippines and Hong Kong before immigrating to the United States where she attended the University of Southern California. The widow of a former Army surgeon, Fely was, upon her death at age 85, buried at Arlington National Cemetery beside her husband.

According to Salvador P. Lopez, she was a dancer who exuded the poise of a polished professional with the smoothness, the grace and the skill that come with confidence in oneself and with certitude of knowledge. She had a brief film career and her most known role was in Back to Bataan as Dalisay Delgado, the former fiancée of Captain Andrés Bonifácio, who is apparently collaborating with the Japanese, broadcasting propaganda over the radio. (In actuality, Delgado was also using the propaganda broadcasts as a means to relay sensitive information to the Filipino resistance without incurring Japanese suspicions).

Choreography
Listed below are some dances that Franquelli created:
 Hindu Temple Dance
 White Eagle (Navajo)
 Chinese Legend (about the goddess of beauty Ming Toy from Hainan)
 Tabu (African)
 Sacro Monte (a paso doble)
 Bulerías (a flamenco from Malaga)
 Gypsy Fortune Teller (a zambra in Granada)
 Jarabe (Mexican)
 Le Singe Qui Danse (a monkey dance)
 The Beast
 Planting Rice
 Tinikling

Filmography
 Back to Bataan (1945) as Dalisay Delgado
 Cry 'Havoc' (1943) as Luisita Esperito
 The Fallen Sparrow (1943) (uncredited) as Gypsy Dancer
 The Leopard Man (1943) (uncredited) as Rosita

References
 Villaruz, B.E.S. "Altar" in CCP Encyclopedia of Philippine Art, 1st ed., Vol. 5, 208. Philippines: CCP Publications Office, 1994.

Notes

External links
 

Filipino film actresses
Filipino choreographers
Filipino female dancers
Filipino emigrants to the United States
Filipino people of Italian descent
Filipino people of Spanish descent
Actresses from Manila
University of Southern California alumni
1916 births
2002 deaths